Knoxville Christian School (KCS) is a private 18 months - 12th grade Christian school in Farragut, Tennessee, near Knoxville.

History

The school was started by local Church of Christ members in 1969 and moved to its present location at 11549 Snyder Road in 1979. The school added a new high school building in 2010, a new baseball complex in 2011, and a new gymnasium  was completed in late 2013. The new basketball courts are named The Wade & Allan Houston Courts through a partnership with these basketball greats.

The current President of KCS is Mr. Bobby Simpson.

Academics

Knoxville Christian School began as a K-5 institution but has expanded over the years to include a comprehensive K-12 offering. The school offers AP courses in core subject areas and has college-credit opportunities with nearby Pellissippi State Community College. As a Christian school, students take courses in the Bible and also attend a twice-weekly chapel.

Knoxville Christian has accreditations from AdvancED, formerly Southern Association of Colleges and Schools (SACS) and the National Christian School Association (NCSA).

In 2012 KCS had an enrollment of greater than 220 students, almost triple the amount the school had in 2008. Through college prep classes the students have improved ACT scores to a 24 average - higher than the state and national averages.

Athletics

Knoxville Christian School currently offers athletic programs in several sports. Joey Brandenburg is the current Athletic Director at KCS. They currently field teams in basketball for K-12 both boys and girls, volleyball for girls in Middle and High School, cheerleading at all levels, cross country, and flag football.

References

External links
 Knoxville Christian School Website
 National Christian School Association Website (NCSA)

Christian schools in Tennessee
Private K-12 schools in Tennessee
Schools in Knox County, Tennessee